Ardhanaari (2012) is a Malayalam film about the life of transgender people in Kerala. The film is directed by Santhosh Souparnika and produced by M. G. Sreekumar under his production house MG Sound & Frames.

Manjula (Manoj K. Jayan), is a transgender with male physique and female behavioural traits, which leads to ridicule and snide remarks from her brother and others. The film brings out the rituals, customs, angst and preferences of transgenders. The title of the film alludes to the half male and half female Hindu god Ardhanarishvara. Also starring in the film are  Mahalakshmi, Maniyanpilla Raju, Thilakan, Sukumari and Sai Kumar. It was one of the last films featuring veteran actor Thilakan who died from heart attack weeks before the release of the film.

The film opened to mixed critical reviews but the performance by Manoj K. Jayan as a transgender gained unanimous appreciation.

Cast
 Manoj K. Jayan as Manjula / Vinayan
 Mahalakshmi as Kokila
 Thilakan as Nayak
 Maniyanpilla Raju as Jameela
 Sukumari as the priest
 Sai Kumar as Vinayan's Father 
 Thesni Khan as Vinayan's sister
 Kochu Preman as the school teacher
 Irshad
 Jayakrishnan as Balu Menon
 Asha Sarath as Balu Menon's wife

Awards
 Nominated—Filmfare Award for Best Actor – Malayalam - Manoj K. Jayan
 Nominated—SIIMA Award for Best Actor - Manoj K. Jayan

References

External links
 

2012 films
2010s Malayalam-language films
Indian LGBT-related films
Cross-dressing in Indian films
Transgender-related films
2012 LGBT-related films